was a Japanese businesswoman. She managed a successful tea-import business with the help of her international foreign contacts. She acted as a patron of, among others, Sakamoto Ryoma. She was a figure of importance in contemporary Japan and a celebrity of sorts; during general Ulysses S. Grant's visit to Japan in 1879, she personally escorted him during an official visit to his ship.

References

 Louis-Frédéric,  Japan Encyclopedia

19th-century Japanese businesswomen
1828 births
1884 deaths
People of Meiji-period Japan